Amy-Jill Levine (born 1956) is University Professor of New Testament, Mary Jane Werthan Professor of Jewish Studies, and Professor of New Testament Studies at Vanderbilt Divinity School, Graduate Department of Religion, and Department of Jewish Studies; she is also Affiliated Professor, Woolf Institute, Centre for the Study of Jewish-Christian Relations, Cambridge UK.

Biography
Amy-Jill Levine was born in 1956. Raised in a predominantly Catholic neighborhood in Massachusetts, she grew up knowing and loving many aspects of the Christian tradition—although she is herself an Orthodox Jew. She completed her undergraduate work at Smith College, where she graduated Phi Beta Kappa and held honors in both religion and English. She earned her doctorate at Duke University.

She has held office in the Society of Biblical Literature, the Catholic Biblical Association, and the Association for Jewish Studies.

Her publications include The Misunderstood Jew: The Church and the Scandal of the Jewish Jesus (HarperSanFrancisco, 2006), the edited collection, The Historical Jesus in Context (Princeton University Press, 2006), and the 14-volume Feminist Companions to the New Testament and Early Christian Writings (Continuum).

A self-described "Yankee Jewish feminist who teaches in a predominantly Protestant divinity school in the buckle of the Bible Belt," Levine "combines historical-critical rigor, literary-critical sensitivity, and a frequent dash of humor with a commitment to eliminating antisemitic, sexist, and homophobic theologies." She is a member of the Orthodox Jewish synagogue Sherith Israel. She accepts the Orthodox Jewish tenet of the afterlife, but "is often quite unorthodox" overall.
Levine has produced lectures on the Old Testament and "Great Figures of the New Testament" for The Teaching Company.

Quotes
Per the introduction by Levine for The Historical Jesus in Context:
There is a consensus of sorts on a basic outline of Jesus' life. Most scholars agree that Jesus was baptized by John, debated with fellow Jews on how best to live according to God's will, engaged in healings and exorcisms, taught in parables, gathered male and female followers in Galilee, went to Jerusalem, and was crucified by Roman soldiers during the governorship of Pontius Pilate (26–36 CE). But, to use the old cliché, the devil is in the details.

Selected publications

Online articles
 https://outreach.faith/2022/09/amy-jill-levine-how-to-read-the-bibles-clobber-passages-on-homosexuality/
 https://web.archive.org/web/20220912160710/https://outreach.faith/2022/09/amy-jill-levine-how-to-read-the-bibles-clobber-passages-on-homosexuality/

References

External links
 Curriculum vitae (May 2011)
 Reviews of The Misunderstood Jew in Interpretation & NYT.

1956 births
Living people
American religion academics
Critics of the Christ myth theory
Duke University alumni
American biblical scholars
American Orthodox Jews
Vanderbilt University faculty
Smith College alumni
Place of birth missing (living people)
Female biblical scholars
21st-century Jewish biblical scholars